Men in Black II: Alien Escape is an action-adventure video game developed by Infogrames Melbourne House and published by Infogrames in 2002 for the PlayStation 2, and was later ported to the GameCube in 2003 by Tantalus. The game is partially based on the Men in Black II movie.

Plot
In Men in Black II: Alien Escape, players take on the role of one of the MIB agents Agent K or Agent J, and are required to stop aliens from blowing up the Earth with a ship based weapon called the Class 7 Ozone Demogrifier. They investigate aliens living on Earth in events similar to the film.

Reception

On Metacritic, the PlayStation 2 version of Men in Black II: Alien Escape has a score of 50 out of 100, indicating "mixed or average reviews". On GameRankings, the GameCube version has a rating of 54%.

References

External links

2002 video games
Action-adventure games
GameCube games
PlayStation 2 games
Video games about extraterrestrial life
Video games based on films
Video games based on Men in Black
Video games developed in Australia
Video games featuring black protagonists
Video games set in New York City